The Ministry of National Food Security & Research or Ministry of Agricultulre (wazarat-e- baraye qaumi tehqeeq o hfzanِ taghzia, Pakistan  (abbreviated as MoA) is a Cabinet-level ministerial department of Government of Pakistan, responsible for implementing, enforcing, developing, and executing the policy on agriculture, rice, livestock, fishing, and farming. The ministry is governed by the Minister of National Food Security and Research, who must be a member of Parliament of Pakistan. According to World Food Programme(WFP) 36.9% of the population faces food security. This is due to limited economic access by the poorest and most vulnerable group of the population – particularly women – to an adequate and diverse diet.

Attached departments

Agricultural Policy Institute
Agriculture Prices Commission was established in 1981 and re-constituted as Agriculture Policy Institute (API) in 2006 as attached department with ministry.

Federal Seed Certification & Registration Department
Provide seed certification and quality control cover for various crops and field inspection of the crops of registered varieties and released varieties.

Animal Quarantine Department

Regulate the import, export and quarantine of animals and animal products, in order to prevent the introduction or spread of exotic diseases and maintain quarantine services of high standards, to protect the livestock industry of Pakistan and other countries.

National Veterinary Laboratory
National Veterinary Laboratory is a national institution for service and regulatory support to national livestock wealth. These laboratories are capable of catering needs in advanced applied biotechnology, bacteriology, virology, analytical chemistry, biochemistry, immunology, molecular biology, toxicology, pathology, parasitology and exotic diseases.

Department of Plant Protection

The department Quarantines and routinely locust Survey and control.

Autonomous bodies

Pakistan Agricultural Research Council

Pakistan Agricultural Research Council (PARC) is the apex national organization working in close collaboration with other federal provincial institutions in the country to provide science-based solutions to agriculture of Pakistan. The organization promote and coordinate agricultural research, arrange expeditious utilization of research results and establish research establishments to fill in the gaps in existing agricultural research system.

Corporations

Pakistan Agriculture Storage and Services Corporation

PASSCO is a public Limited Company, its functions include maintaining strategic reserves of wheat and other specified commodities
and procurement of food commodities at Government’s fix price.

Boards

Pakistan Oilseed Development Board
Pakistan Oil-seed Development Board (PODB) was established in 1995 to enhance indigenous oil-seed production. PODB serves  as an important national institution for the development of oilseed sector in the country, besides providing regulatory and policy framework to this sector.

Livestock and Dairy Development Board
Plan, promote, facilitate and coordinate livestock, poultry and dairy sectors development of Pakistan.

Fisheries Development Board
Fisheries Development Board is set up to provide and maintain a platform for enhancing and promoting fisheries sector in Pakistan. The board Coordinates with national and provincial activities with relation to aquaculture and shrimp farming and development of market infrastructure and improvement of marketing of fisheries products

Companies

Pakistan Dairy Development Company
Pakistan Dairy Development Company (PDDC or Dairy Pakistan) has been established to drive the development of the Pakistan dairy sector. Dairy Pakistan is a Public-Private sector joint initiative to bring about structural long term change in the dairy industry in Pakistan. Dairy Pakistan is chartered to coordinate, manage and facilitate initiatives leading to the development of the dairy sector in the country.

Cell

Federal Water Management Cell
Federal Water Management Cell serves as an arm of the Ministry to deal with all the matters related to irrigation water management and agriculture mechanization.

See also 
 Agriculture in Pakistan

External links
 Official site
 Pakistan Dairy Development Company
 Pakistan Agricultural Research Council
 PASSCO
 Department of Plant Protection
 Livestock & Dairy Development Board
 Fisheries Development Board

References

Pakistan
Agricultural organisations based in Pakistan
National Food Security and Research
Pakistan